This list of archaeology awards is an index to articles on notable awards given for archaeology, the study of human activity through the recovery and analysis of material culture.
View the individual articles for more detail.

Awards

See also

 Lists of awards
 List of social sciences awards

References

 
Archaeology